The year 2001 is the third year in the history of King of the Cage, a mixed martial arts promotion based in The United States. In 2001 King of the Cage held 5 events, KOTC 7: Wet and Wild.

Title fights

Events list

KOTC 7: Wet and Wild

KOTC 7: Wet and Wild was an event held on February 24, 2001 at the Soboba Casino in San Jacinto, California, United States.

Results

KOTC 8: Bombs Away

KOTC 8: Bombs Away was an event held on April 29, 2001 at the Colusa Casino in Williams, California, United States.

Results

KOTC 9: Showtime

KOTC 9: Showtime was an event held on June 23, 2001 at the Soboba Casino in San Jacinto, California, United States.

Results

KOTC 10: Critical Mass

KOTC 10: Critical Mass was an event held on August 4, 2001 in California, United States.

Results

KOTC 11: Domination

KOTC 11: Domination was an event held on September 29, 2001 at the Soboba Casino in San Jacinto, California, United States.

Results

See also 
 List of King of the Cage events
 List of King of the Cage champions

References

King of the Cage events
2001 in mixed martial arts